The 2021 Wake Forest Demon Deacons men's soccer team represented Wake Forest University during the 2021 NCAA Division I men's soccer season. It was the 75th season of the university fielding a program. It was the program's seventh season with Bobby Muuss as head coach. The Demon Deacons played their home matches at Spry Stadium.

The Demon Deacons finished the season 13–7–1 overall and 4–3–1 in ACC play to finish in third place in the Atlantic Division.  As the sixth overall seed in the ACC Tournament they defeated Virginia in the First Round before losing to Duke in the Quarterfinals.  They received an at-large bid to the NCAA Tournament.  They were an unseeded team and defeated Mercer in the First Round and thirteenth seed FIU in the Second Round before losing to fourth seed Notre Dame to end their season.

Background

The teams' 2020 season was significantly impacted by the COVID-19 pandemic, which curtailed the fall season and caused the NCAA Tournament to be played in Spring 2021. The ACC was one of the only two conferences in men's soccer to play in the fall of 2020.  The ACC also held a mini-season during the spring of 2021.

The Demon Deacons finished the fall season 5–1–0 and 7–2–0 in ACC play to finish in first place in the South Division.  In the ACC Tournament they lost to Virginia in the Quarterfinals.  They finished the spring season 4–0–2 and 3–0–2 in ACC play, to finish in third place in the Atlantic Division.  They received an at-large bid to the NCAA Tournament.  As the fifth seed in the tournament, they defeated Coastal Carolina in the Second Round and Kentucky in the Third Round before losing to North Carolina in the Quarterfinals to end their season.

Four Demon Deacons men's soccer players were selected in the 2021 MLS SuperDraft: Calvin Harris, Michael DeShields, Justin McMaster and Andrew Pannenberg.

Player movement

Players leaving

Players arriving

Squad

Roster

Team management

Source:

Schedule

Source:

|-
!colspan=6 style=""| Exhibition

|-
!colspan=6 style=""| Regular season

|-
!colspan=6 style=""| ACC Tournament

|-
!colspan=6 style=""| NCAA Tournament

Awards and honors

2022 MLS Super Draft

Source:

Rankings

References

2021
Wake Forest Demon Deacons
Wake Forest Demon Deacons
Wake Forest Demon Deacons men's soccer
Wake Forest